Pellegrino Tomaso Ronchi (19 January 1930 – 24 October 2018) was an Italian bishop, emeritus of the Diocese of Città di Castello.

Biography 
He was ordained a priest on 21 March 1953. He first was appointed bishop of the Diocese of Porto-Santa Rufina on 7 December 1984, receiving his episcopal consecration on 6 January 1985 from Pope John Paul II.
He then resigned from this position, due to illness problem, on 9 November 1985. Later he was appointed bishop of Diocese of Città di Castello on 7 February 1991. Ronchi retired as bishop on 16 June 2007.

References

External links
Profile of Mons. Ronchi www.catholic-hierarchy.org
Profile of Mons. Ronchi www.gcatholic.org

1930 births
2018 deaths
People from the Province of Ravenna
20th-century Italian Roman Catholic bishops
Capuchin bishops